Lacuna parva, common name the tiny lacuna, is a species of sea snail, a marine gastropod mollusk in the family Littorinidae, the winkles or periwinkles.

Distribution
 Southern Cape Cod and Nantucket, Massachusetts 
 Distribution similar with L. vincta but extending further south to Spanish coasts

References

  Abbott, R. T. (1974). American seashells. The marine Mollusca of the Atlantic and Pacific coast of North America. ed. 2. Van Nostrand, New York. 663 pp., 24 pls

External links
Da Costa, Mendes E. (1778). Historia naturalis testaceorum Britanniæ, or, the British conchology; containing the descriptions and other particulars of natural history of the shells of Great Britain and Ireland: illustrated with figures. In English and French. - Historia naturalis testaceorum Britanniæ, ou, la conchologie Britannique; contenant les descriptions & autres particularités d'histoire naturelle des coquilles de la Grande Bretagne & de l'Irlande: avec figures en taille douce. En anglois & françois., i-xii, 1-254, i-vii, (1), Pl. I-XVII. London. (Millan, White, Emsley & Robson).
 Adams, J. (1800). Descriptions of some minute British shells. Transactions of the Linnean Society of London. 5(1): 1-6
 Montagu, G. (1803). Testacea Britannica or natural history of British shells, marine, land, and fresh-water, including the most minute: Systematically arranged and embellished with figures. J. White, London, Vol. 1, xxxvii + 291 pp;; Vol. 2, pp. 293–606, pl. 1-16
  Locard, A. (1886). Prodrome de malacologie française. Catalogue général des mollusques vivants de France. Mollusques marins. Lyon: H. Georg & Paris: Baillière. x + 778 pp
 Turton, W. (1819) A Conchological Dictionary of the British Islands. J. Booth, London, xxvii + 272 pp., 28 pls
 effreys J.G. (1862-1869). British conchology. Vol. 1: pp. cxiv + 341
 Marshall J.T. (1893). Additions to 'British Conchology' (Part I). Journal of Conchology. 7: 241-265
 Gofas, S.; Le Renard, J.; Bouchet, P. (2001). Mollusca. in: Costello, M.J. et al. (eds), European Register of Marine Species: a check-list of the marine species in Europe and a bibliography of guides to their identification. Patrimoines Naturels. 50: 180-213
 Ockelmann, K. W. & Nielsen, C. (1981). On the biology of the prosobranch Lacuna parva in the Øresund. Ophelia. 20(1): 1-16
 Reid D.G. (1989) The comparative morphology, phylogeny and evolution of the gastropod family Littorinidae. Philosophical Transactions of the Royal Society B 324: 1-110

Littorinidae
Gastropods described in 1778